Frederik Riis Rønnow (born 4 August 1992) is a Danish professional footballer who plays as a goalkeeper for Bundesliga club Union Berlin and the Denmark national team.

Club career

Horsens
Rønnow started his career as a youth player at Horsens club Stensballe IK before he at the age of 16 years joined AC Horsens. He made his first team debut on 7 September 2011 in a Danish Cup match against Holstebro, a game Horsens won 5–0.

Already being the first choice goalkeeper for the Danish U21 team, and having been awarded the Horsens Player of the Year Award for the 2012–13 season, Rønnow's agent, former Danish international John Sivebæk, expressed his reluctance for his client to be playing in the Danish 1st Division following Horsens' relegation from the Danish Superliga. As a consequence, on 5 July 2013, Rønnow moved to Superliga club Esbjerg fB on a season-long loan following the departure of Lukáš Hrádecký.

Brøndby
In July 2015, Rønnow signed a four-year contract with Brøndby IF. He made two appearances in the UEFA Europa League in which Brøndby were knocked out by PAOK. In the league he played 33 gamed as the team finished in fourth place.

In the 2016–17 season, Rønnow played seven games in the Europa League qualifiers in which he was sent off once, as Brøndby were eliminated by Panathinaikos. He also played three times in the Danish Cup tournament and appeared in 34 total matches in regular season as well as the championship round.

In his final season with Brøndby, the 2017–18 season, the team finished second in the league and won the cup by beating Silkeborg IF 3–1 under head coach Alexander Zorniger.

Eintracht Frankfurt
In April 2018 it was announced that Rønnow would join Eintracht Frankfurt in July 2018, again mirroring the movements of Hrádecký. He made his debut in the German Super Cup on 12 August 2018. He was brought in to be the starting goalkeeper and appeared in Eintracht's first three competitive games. Due to insecure performances, Eintracht loaned Kevin Trapp from Paris Saint-Germain shortly before the end of the summer transfer window, and Rønnow lost his starting spot. During his first season he made a total of two appearances in the league and in Europa League, in which Frankfurt reached the semi-finals. Trapp signed a permanent deal after the 2018–19 season, but suffered an injury and was sidelined for large parts of the first half of the 2019–20 season. Rønnow replaced him in goal and was able to convince with strong performances.

Loan to Schalke 04
On 30 September 2020, he joined Schalke 04 on a year-long loan. Rønnow first replaced Ralf Fährmann as the starting goalkeeper and made 7 Bundesliga appearances. Then, he fell out with an injury; Schalke's managers Manuel Baum, Huub Stevens, Christian Gross and Dimitrios Grammozis relied on the services of Fährmann again after his recovery, which meant that Rønnow only came to four more appearances by the end of the season after Fährmann was sidelined with an injury. With Schalke, he suffered relegation to the 2. Bundesliga at the end of the season and he then subsequently returned to Frankfurt.

Union Berlin
On 20 July 2021, Rønnow joined Union Berlin on a three-year contract, and would initially start his stint with the club as a backup to starter Andreas Luthe. He made his debut on 27 October in a DFB-Pokal match against Waldhof Mannheim, which ended in a 3–1 win.

International career
After playing for several Danish youth teams, he was called up to represent the senior Denmark national team on 9 March 2016 by new head coach Åge Hareide, for friendly matches against Iceland and Scotland.

In June 2018 he was named in Denmark's squad for the 2018 FIFA World Cup in Russia.

In June 2021, he was included in the national team's bid for 2020 UEFA Euro, where the team reached the semi-finals, but did not play in a single match.

Career statistics

Club

International

Honours
Brøndby
 Danish Cup: 2017–18

References

External links

Official Danish League Stats

1992 births
Living people
People from Horsens
Danish men's footballers
Association football goalkeepers
Denmark international footballers
Denmark youth international footballers
Denmark under-21 international footballers
2018 FIFA World Cup players
UEFA Euro 2020 players
2022 FIFA World Cup players
Danish Superliga players
Danish 1st Division players
Bundesliga players
AC Horsens players
Esbjerg fB players
Brøndby IF players
Eintracht Frankfurt players
FC Schalke 04 players
1. FC Union Berlin players
Danish expatriate men's footballers
Danish expatriate sportspeople in Germany
Expatriate footballers in Germany
Sportspeople from the Central Denmark Region